The Commons Select Committee on Standards is appointed by the House of Commons to oversee the work of the Parliamentary Commissioner for Standards.

History
The committee was created on 13 December 2012 as one half of the replacements for the Committee on Standards and Privileges. Following the expenses scandal, it was considered desirable for lay members to provide oversight of standards of conduct of MPs, but it was not considered proper for individuals who were not members of parliament to make decisions on parliamentary privilege. The Standards and Privileges Committee was therefore split in two, with MPs (including the chair) by convention being elected to serve on both committees simultaneously, but with an additional cohort of lay members sitting on the Standards Committee.

In the wake of the Owen Paterson affair in November 2021, the Conservative government proposed removing the lay members entirely, which would leave the Conservatives with a majority of control on a newly re-constituted committee. MPs backed these reforms in a Common vote, as well as overturning the 30-day suspension of Paterson that had been recommended by the committee.  However, these reforms were abandoned the following day amid widespread criticism, including from Conservative MPs. Paterson subsequently resigned as an MP.

Membership
The committee and its composition are regulated by House of Commons standing orders 149 and 149A, which specify that it shall consist of seven MPs and seven lay members. Lay members are permitted to serve a single six-year term and cannot ever have been members of either house of Parliament. Unlike membership of other select committees, lay membership of the Standards Committee is not terminated by a parliamentary dissolution. The role of chair of the committee is reserved for a member of the official opposition. The government Attorney General and Solicitor General has a right of attendance, but are not members.

, the members on the committee are as follows:

External links 
 The Committee's website

References

Select Committees of the British House of Commons